Oleksandr Ivanovych Materukhin (born 17 October 1981) is a Ukrainian-Belarusian professional former ice hockey right winger. He formerly played with Belarusian club, HC Dinamo Minsk of the Kontinental Hockey League (KHL). Internationally he played for both Ukraine and Belarus.

Career statistics

Regular season and playoffs

References

External links

1981 births
Living people
Acadie–Bathurst Titan players
Belarusian ice hockey right wingers
Des Moines Buccaneers players
HC Donbass players
HC Dinamo Minsk players
Houston Aeros (1994–2013) players
HK Mogilev players
HK Neman Grodno players
Louisiana IceGators (ECHL) players
Pensacola Ice Pilots players
Richmond Renegades players
HC Shakhtyor Soligorsk players
Ukrainian ice hockey right wingers
HC Yugra players
Yunost Minsk players
Ukrainian expatriate sportspeople in Belarus
Ukrainian expatriate sportspeople in Canada
Ukrainian expatriate sportspeople in the United States